Korsvold is a Norwegian surname. Notable people with the surname include:

Åge Korsvold (born 1946), Norwegian businessman
Anne Marit Korsvold, Norwegian ski-orienteering competitor

Norwegian-language surnames